Big business involves large-scale corporate-controlled financial or business activities. As a term, it describes activities that run from "huge transactions" to the more general "doing big things". In corporate jargon, the concept is commonly known as enterprise, or activities involving enterprise customers.

The concept first rose in a symbolic sense after 1880 in connection with the combination movement that began in American business at that time. United States corporations that fall into the category of "big business"  include ExxonMobil, Walmart, Google, Microsoft, Apple, General Electric, General Motors, Citigroup, Goldman Sachs, and JPMorgan Chase. The largest German corporations  included Daimler AG, Deutsche Telekom, Siemens, and Deutsche Bank. Among the largest companies in the United Kingdom  are HSBC, Barclays, WPP plc, and BP.
The latter half of the 19th century saw more technological advances and corporate growth in additional sectors, such as petroleum, machinery, chemicals, and electrical equipment. (See Second Industrial Revolution.)

History

Origin of term
The Oxford English Dictionary identifies the first use of the term, in 1905, to be in "The City: The Hope of Democracy", Frederic C. Howe.

Early 20th century
The automotive industry began modestly in the late-19th century, but grew rapidly following the development of large-scale gasoline production in the early 20th century.

Post-World War II
The relatively stable period of rebuilding after World War II led to new technologies (some of which were spin-offs from the war years) and new businesses.

Computers
The new technology of computers spread worldwide in the post war years. Businesses built around computer technology include: IBM, Microsoft, Apple Inc., Samsung, and Intel.

Electronics
Miniaturization and integrated circuits, together with an expansion of radio and television technologies, provided fertile ground for business development. Electronics businesses include JVC, Sony (Masaru Ibuka and Akio Morita), and Texas Instruments (Cecil H. Green, J. Erik Jonsson, Eugene McDermott, and Patrick E. Chodery), while also the companies in the computer-section above can be considered electronics.

Energy
Nuclear power was added to fossil fuel as the main sources of energy.

Criticism of big business
The social consequences of the concentration of economic power in the hands of those persons controlling "big business" has been a constant concern both of economists and of politicians since the end of the 19th century.  Various attempts have been made to investigate the effects of "bigness" upon labor, consumers, and investors, as well as upon prices and competition. "Big business" has been accused of a wide variety of misdeeds that range from the exploitation of the working class to the corruption of politicians and the fomenting of war.

Influence over government

Corporate concentration can lead to influence over government in areas such as tax policy, trade policy, environmental policy, foreign policy, and labor policy through lobbying. In 2005, the majority of Americans believed that big business has "too much power in Washington."

See also

 Almighty dollar
 Big Alcohol
 Big Chocolate
 Big data
 Big government
 Big media
 Big Oil
 Big Pharma
 Big Science
 Big Soda
 Big Tech
 Big Tobacco
 Corporatocracy
 Evil corporation
 Keiretsu
 Major film studios
 Megacorporation
 Small business
 Zaibatsu

References

 Dictionary of American History by James Truslow Adams, New York: Charles Scribner's Sons, 1940.

Business terms
Political terminology
Libertarian terms